Alma Shealey Adams (born May 27, 1946) is an American politician who represents North Carolina's 12th congressional district in the United States House of Representatives. A Democrat, Adams represented the state's 58th House district in Guilford County in the North Carolina General Assembly from her appointment in April 1994 until her election to Congress, succeeded by Ralph C. Johnson. A college administrator and art professor from Greensboro, Adams is known for her many distinctive hats (she claims to own 900). She won the 2014 special election in North Carolina's 12th congressional district to fill the vacancy created by the resignation of Mel Watt, becoming the 100th woman serving in the 113th Congress. She won election to a full two-year term at the same time.

Early life and education
Adams was born on May 27, 1946, in High Point, North Carolina. Her parents were Benjamin Shealey and the former Mattie Stokes. She graduated from West Side High School in Newark, New Jersey, in 1964. Adams received her B.S. degree in 1969 and her M.S. degree in 1972, both from North Carolina A&T University and both in art education. She received her Ph.D. in art education/multicultural education from Ohio State University in 1981. Adams is a member of Alpha Kappa Alpha sorority.

State legislature
Adams was a member of the Greensboro City School Board from 1984 to 1986 and a Greensboro City Council member from 1987 until her appointment to the House of Representatives in 1994.

She was appointed to North Carolina House in 1994 to replace Herman Gist, who died in office. The district is in Guilford County and includes most of southeastern Greensboro. She had already announced that she was going to challenge Gist in the Democratic primary that year. After being appointed to the seat, Adams faced conservative businessman and retired engineer O. C. Stafford in the Democratic primary. Stafford was a perennial candidate who had run for various offices, sometimes as a Democrat and sometimes as a Republican. He had challenged Gist as a Republican in the 1992 general election. In 1994, as a Democrat, Stafford lost to Adams in the primary.

Adams won a full term in the general election, beating Republican Roger G. Coffer. She faced a rematch with Stafford in the general elections of 1996 and 1998 when Stafford ran as a Republican. Adams won both elections. In 2000 Adams did not have an opponent in the Democratic primary; she defeated Republican real estate broker Jim Rumley in the general election.

In 2002, after redistricting, Adams's seat was changed from the 26th district to the 58th. Her only challenger that year was Libertarian lawyer David Williams, who withdrew from the race in October because he was moving to Colorado. His name still appeared on the ballot, but Adams won with nearly 86% of the vote.

Adams has been challenged for her seat for many years by Republican legal assistant and party activist Olga Morgan Wright. Wright has run for the seat held by Adams in nearly every election since 2004. Adams defeated Wright and Libertarian challenger Walter Sperko with 66% of the vote in 2004. In the next election Adams had no competition in the primary; she defeated Wright in the general election 66%–34%. In 2008, the year Barack Obama was elected president, Democratic voters had a high rate of participation, and Adams defeated Wright 71.35%–28.65%

In 2008, Adams was elected to a second term as chair of the North Carolina Legislative Black Caucus.

Adams was vice-chair of the Government Committee in the state House. Previously she was chair of the Appropriations Committee as well as vice-chair of the Commerce, Small Business and Entrepreneurship Committee.

In 2010, Adams was challenged in the Democratic primary by Ralph C. Johnson. She defeated Johnson with 76.56% of the vote. Adams next faced Republican Darin H. Thomas in the general election, beating him 63.15%–36.85%. In 2012, Adams had no primary opposition and defeated Olga Wright in the general election, 79.86%–20.14%.

U.S. House of Representatives

Elections

2014 special and general elections

In April 2013, Mel Watt, the only congressman to have served the 12th District since its creation in 1993, was appointed director of the Federal Housing Finance Agency. Adams was one of the first to announce that if Watt were confirmed, she would run in the ensuing special election. Watt was confirmed in December 2013. Adams formally filed paperwork to run in both the Democratic primary for a full two-year term in the 114th Congress and the special election held in November 2014 to fill the balance of Watt's 11th term. Adams was sworn in on November 12, 2014, to complete the remaining seven weeks of Watt's term. After the swearing-in, Adams became the 100th female member of the congressional class, beating the previous record of 99. Adams was reelected to the seat in 2016 and 2018.

Analysts thought that Adams was at a geographic disadvantage in the five-way primary for both the special and regular elections (held on the same day in November 2014). She is from Greensboro, but the bulk of the district's population is in Charlotte. But with three Charlotteans in the race splitting that region's vote, Adams won both primaries with about 44% of the vote, a few thousand votes over the 40% threshold needed to avoid a runoff. She faced Republican Vince Coakley, a former television and radio broadcaster from Matthews, in the general and special elections, which were held on the same day. The 12th was a heavily Democratic district with a majority-black voting population and a Cook Partisan Voting Index of D+26, and Adams won both elections handily.

Adams is the second woman of color to represent North Carolina in the House. The first was Eva Clayton, who represented much of eastern North Carolina from 1992 to 2002.

In the 2016 presidential election, Adams endorsed Hillary Clinton and pledged her support as a superdelegate.

Adams is a member of the Congressional Progressive Caucus, the Congressional Black Caucus, and the Congressional Arts Caucus.

Adams decided not to attend the January 2017 Inauguration of Donald Trump.

Tenure

In February 2022, Adams and Representatives A. Donald McEachin and Brian Fitzpatrick introduced the African American Burial Grounds Preservation Act, would have the National Park Service work with local governments to identify, survey, research, and preserve historic African American cemeteries and burial grounds. The legislation has bipartisan support in the House.

Adams's residency questioned

A court-ordered redistricting in 2016 made the 12th somewhat more compact. It now comprised nearly all of Mecklenburg County, home to Charlotte. Adams's home in Greensboro was drawn into the 13th district. She had already filed for a second full term, but announced she would move to Charlotte. She claims a home in Charlotte's Fourth Ward neighborhood owned by Mary Gaffney, one of her prominent supporters, as her official residence in the district. Both Gaffney and Adams maintain active voter registrations at that address. On May 31, WBTV in Charlotte reported that Adams filed campaign finance documents listing her longtime home in Greensboro as her residence, and also spends most weekends in her Greensboro home. WBTV also reported that Adams had scrubbed all references to her service as a local official in Greensboro from her campaign website, though her biography on her campaign's Facebook page still contained references to that service. When a WBTV reporter approached Adams at her home in Greensboro, she backed out of her driveway and drove away and was later found hiding out in her car near the entrance to her neighborhood. When the reporter attempted to confront her, she drove away a second time. While members of Congress are only required to live in the state they represent, it is customary for them to live in or near the district they represent.

With seven Charlotteans splitting the vote, Adams won the 2016 Democratic primary with 42%. This all but assured her of a second full term; due to Charlotte and Mecklenburg County's heavy swing to the Democrats in recent years, the reconfigured 12th is no less Democratic than its predecessor.

Committee assignments
Committee on Agriculture (Vice Chair)
Subcommittee on Nutrition, Oversight, and Department Operations
Committee on Education and Labor
Subcommittee on Workforce Protections (Chair)
Committee on Financial Services
Subcommittee on Diversity and Inclusion

Caucus memberships
Congressional Progressive Caucus
Blue Collar Caucus
Congressional Black Caucus
Congressional Arts Caucus

Other work
Adams has been a professor of art at Bennett College in Greensboro, as well as the director of the Steel Hall Art Gallery. In 1990, she and Eva Hamlin Miller co-founded the African American Atelier, an organization established to advance awareness and appreciation for visual arts and cultures of African Americans.

Adams chairs the North Carolina Legislative Black Caucus Foundation, which gives scholarships to students who attend one of North Carolina's Historically Black Colleges and Universities.

Personal life
Adams is divorced and has two children. She is well known for her many distinctive hats.

See also
List of African-American United States representatives
Women in the United States House of Representatives

References

External links

Congresswoman Alma Adams official U.S. House website
Alma Adams for Congress
 

 

|-

|-

|-

1946 births
20th-century American politicians
20th-century American women politicians
21st-century American politicians
21st-century American women politicians
Bennett College faculty
African-American members of the United States House of Representatives
African-American state legislators in North Carolina
African-American women in politics
Democratic Party members of the United States House of Representatives from North Carolina
Female members of the United States House of Representatives
Living people
Democratic Party members of the North Carolina House of Representatives
North Carolina A&T State University alumni
Ohio State University College of Education and Human Ecology alumni
Politicians from Newark, New Jersey
West Side High School (New Jersey) alumni
Women state legislators in North Carolina
American women academics
20th-century African-American women
20th-century African-American politicians
21st-century African-American women
21st-century African-American politicians